Tellus Series A: Dynamic Meteorology and Oceanography is a peer-reviewed scientific journal that is published by Co-action Publishing on behalf of the International Meteorological Institute in Stockholm, Sweden. Since January 2012, the journal is published open access. Until that time it had been published as a subscription journal by Blackwell Munksgaard. The journal publishes original articles, short contributions and correspondence encompassing dynamic meteorology, climatology and oceanography, including numerical modelling, synoptic meteorology, weather forecasting, and climate analysis.

Tellus A is the companion to Tellus Series B: Chemical and Physical Meteorology.

See also 
 List of scientific journals
 List of scientific journals in earth and atmospheric sciences

References

External links 
 
 Journal page at Blackwell Munksgaard

Earth and atmospheric sciences journals
Wiley-Blackwell academic journals
Publications established in 1948
Bimonthly journals
English-language journals
Creative Commons-licensed journals